Magyar ralibajnokság – the annual series of Hungarian Rally Championship existing from 1974. As of 2010, championship consists of seven rounds on different surfaces (five on tarmac) throughout Hungary. The organizer and owner of the cycle is MNASZ (Magyar Nemzeti Autósport Szövetség, which means Hungarian National Motor Union).

Champions

References

External links

 Official site of MNASZ

Rally racing series
Rally Championship
Rally
1974 establishments in Hungary
Recurring sporting events established in 1974